The Carlos Palanca Memorial Awards for Literature winners in the year 1957 (rank, title of winning entry, name of author).


English division
Short story
First prize: "High Into Morning" by Juan C. Tuvera
Second prize: "The Treasures" by Rony V. Diaz
Third prize: "Sunburn" by Gilda Cordero Fernando

One-act play
First prize: "Play the Judas" by Jesus T. Peralta
Second prize: "The Dancers" by Alberto S. Florentino Jr.
Third prize: "The Efficiency Expert" by Isabel Taylor Escoda

Filipino (Tagalog) division
Short story in Filipino
First prize: "Sugat ng Digma" by Pedro S. Dandan
Second prize: "Punong-kahoy" by Buenaventura S. Medina Jr.
Third prize: "Pag-uugat... Pagsusupling" by Eduardo B. Reyes

One-act play in Filipino
Consolation prizes:
 "Aling Poling" by Deogracias Tigno Jr.
 "Baril at Kaligtasan" by Fernando L. Samonte
 "Daloy ng Buhay" by Alejandro G. Abadilla and Elpidio P. Kapulong
 "Kamay na Bakal" by Pablo M. Cuasay
 "May Pangako ang Bukas" by Emmanuel H. Borlaza

More winners by year

References
 

1957
1957 literary awards